Patrik Flodin (born 16 August 1984) is a rally driver from Sweden. Flodin won the Swedish Championship in 2006. In 2009, Flodin contests in the Production World Rally Championship (PWRC) with the Uspenskiy Rally Tecnica (URT) team, driving a Subaru Impreza. He also became the 2009 Russian Rally Champion. In Sardinia 2011, he will be driving a Mini Countryman WRC.

WRC results

* Season still in progress.

PWRC results

WRC-2 results

References

External links
patrikflodin.com
WRC.com
Autoreview magazine 

1984 births
Living people
World Rally Championship drivers
Swedish rally drivers